Sri Krishna 2006 is a 2006 Indian Telugu-language film directed by Vijayendra Prasad and produced by D. Ramanaidu. The film stars Srikanth, Venu Thottempudi, Ramya Krishna and Gowri Munjal. The film was a box office success.

Plot

Cast 
 Srikanth as Ramakrishna Raju
 Venu Thottempudi as Venkateswarulu
 Ramya Krishna
 Gowri Munjal as Indu
 Dharmavarapu Subramanyam
 Bramhanandam
 Ali
 Jeeva
 Venu Madhav
 Telangana Shakuntala
 Gundu Hanumantha Rao
 Jhansi
 Annapurna as Venkateswarulu's grandmother
 Lakshman Rao Kondavalasa
 Kodi Ramakrishna

Music

The music  of the film was composed by M. M. Srilekha.

Reception 
A critic from Full Hyderabad wrote that "Unless you have similar problems and need ideas, wait for this to hit the TV channels".

References

External links
 

2000s Telugu-language films
2006 films
Suresh Productions films